Candelariaceae is a family of lichen-forming fungi in the order Candelariales. It contains seven genera and about 73 species. The family was circumscribed by Finnish lichenologist Rainar Hakulinen in 1954 to contain the type genus, Candelaria.

Genera
Candelaria  – 7 spp.
Candelariella  – ca. 50 spp.
Candelina  – 3 spp.
Candelinella  – 2 spp.
Opeltiella  – 4 spp.
Placomaronea  – 6 spp.
Protocandelariella  – 2 spp.

References

Candelariales
Lichen families
Ascomycota families
Taxa described in 1954
Taxa named by Rainar Hakulinen